Medikonduru mandal is one of the 57 mandals in Guntur district of the Indian state of Andhra Pradesh. The mandal is under the administration of Guntur revenue division and the headquarters are located at Medikonduru. It is located at a distance 20 km from the district headquarters.

Demographics 
 census, the mandal had a population of  60,144. The total population constitute, 30682 males and 29462 females with a sex ratio of 976 females per 1000 males. 6912 children are in the age group of 0–6 years.

Towns and villages 
 census, the mandal has 12 villages.
The settlements in the mandal are listed below:

Administration
The mandal is under the control of a tahsildar and the present tahsildar is P. Jaganmohan Rao.
Medikonduru mandal is one of the 5 mandals under Assembly constituency, which in turn represents Tadikona Assembly of Andhra Pradesh.

See also
 List of mandals in Andhra Pradesh
 Villages in Atchampet mandal

References

External links

Mandals in Guntur district